Cairns-Whitten-Blauvelt House is a historic house located in Wyckoff, Bergen County, New Jersey, United States. Built in 1770 by Douglas Cairns, it was added to the National Register of Historic Places on January 10, 1983.

See also
National Register of Historic Places listings in Bergen County, New Jersey

References

Houses on the National Register of Historic Places in New Jersey
Houses completed in 1770
Houses in Bergen County, New Jersey
National Register of Historic Places in Bergen County, New Jersey
Wyckoff, New Jersey
New Jersey Register of Historic Places
1770 establishments in New Jersey